Diego Matías Rodríguez Marrón (born 25 June 1989) is an Argentine professional footballer who plays as a goalkeeper for Godoy Cruz.

Club career
Born in Mar del Plata, Rodríguez made his debut in Independiente on 16 June 2011 against Huracán when coach Antonio Mohamed had to put him in the first team since Hilario Navarro, Fabián Assman and Adrián Gabbarini were all injured.

Rodríguez subsequently represented Rosario Central, JEF United Chiba, Defensa y Justicia and Central Córdoba before joining La Liga side Elche CF on 5 October 2020. He terminated his contract with the latter club on 1 February 2021, after just three cup matches.

International career
Rodríguez was called up by coach Sergio Batista as part of the  Argentina U-20 team for the 2009 South American U-20 Championship He was a key player in the match against Ecuador that let the team advance to the second round where they were eventually eliminated.

Notes

References

External links

Player's profile at Independiente's official website 

1989 births
Living people
Argentine footballers
Argentine expatriate footballers
Association football goalkeepers
Sportspeople from Mar del Plata
Club Atlético Independiente footballers
Rosario Central footballers
JEF United Chiba players
Defensa y Justicia footballers
Central Córdoba de Santiago del Estero footballers
Panetolikos F.C. players
Godoy Cruz Antonio Tomba footballers
Argentine Primera División players
Primera Nacional players
J2 League players
Elche CF players
Argentine expatriate sportspeople in Japan
Argentine expatriate sportspeople in Spain
Argentine expatriate sportspeople in Greece
Expatriate footballers in Japan
Expatriate footballers in Spain
Expatriate footballers in Greece